Icadyptes is an extinct genus of giant penguins from the Late Eocene tropics of South America.

Etymology 
The genus name is a combination of "Ica" for the Peruvian region where the type species was found and "dyptes" from the Greek word for diver. The species epithet "salasi" refers to Rodolfo Salas Gismondi, a noted Peruvian paleontologist.

Description 
It had an exceptionally long spear-like beak resembling that of a heron. The researchers who discovered the penguins believe the long, pointed beaks to be the likely ancestral shape for all penguins.

Discovery 
The fossilised remains of the penguin, which lived approximately 36 million years ago, were found in the Otuma Formation, in the coastal desert of Peru by the team of North Carolina State University palaeontologist Dr. Julia Clarke, assistant professor of marine, earth and atmospheric sciences. Its well-preserved Fossil skeleton was found on the southern coast of Peru together with an early Eocene species Perudyptes devriesi (comparable in size to the living King penguin), and the remains of three other previously undescribed penguin species, all of which seem to have preferred the tropics over colder latitudes.

Evolution 
Icadyptes salasi and Perudyptes devriesi appear to have flourished at warmer latitudes at a time when world temperatures were at their warmest over the past 65 million years. Only a few modern-day penguins, such as the African and Galapagos penguins prefer such a balmy climate.

The discovery of the fossils has caused a re-evaluation of penguin evolution and expansion. Previously, scientists believed that penguins evolved near the poles in Antarctica and New Zealand, and moved closer to the equator around 10 million years ago. Since Icadyptes salasi lived in Peru during a period of great warmth, penguins must have adapted to warm climates around 30 million years earlier than previously believed.

References 

Sphenisciformes
Extinct penguins
Eocene birds of South America
Tinguirirican
Divisaderan
Paleogene Peru
Fossils of Peru
Fossil taxa described in 2007